Gesnerus,  commemorating in its title the Swiss naturalist and bibliographer  Conrad Gessner, is a peer-reviewed scientific journal published twice yearly in Basel, with editorial offices in Lausanne. Gesnerus covers  the history of medicine and the History of science. It publishes original articles in the Helvetic languages, German, French and Italian and also English. Gesnerus is the official journal of the Swiss Society for the History of Medicine and Sciences (SSHMS). Its articles also focus on theoretical and social aspects of these subjects. Gesnerus likewise contains book reviews, reports on current developments and announcements.

Bibliography

Notes

History of science journals
History of medicine journals